Bold As Love, first published in 2001, is a science fiction novel by British writer Gwyneth Jones. It is the first of a series of five books written by Gwyneth Jones and set in a near-future version of the United Kingdom. The full title of the novel is Bold as Love: a Near Future Fantasy. It combines elements of Science fiction, Fantasy and Horror fiction, while dealing with issues of gender, politics, and environmental concerns. The subject matter refers heavily to popular music.

The book was nominated for and won the Arthur C Clarke Award in 2002. It was also shortlisted for the 2001 BSFA Award and the 2002 British Fantasy Award August Derleth Award. However, the work is criticized for its hyperbolic character portrayal and absence of logical resolutions to story arches in favor of publishing sequels.

Plot summary
Ax Preston, a mixed-race guitarist from Taunton, having survived a government-organised massacre of the official Green Party (under cover of a pop-culture reception à la "Cool Britannia" in Hyde Park), emerges from the ensuing chaos as the true leader England desperately needs. He and his friends, also Indie musicians, tackle an outrageous series of disasters, including a minor war with Islamic Separatists in Yorkshire, and a hippie President who turns out to be a murdering paedophile. In the background the whole of Europe is falling apart, in the foreground there are rock festivals, street-fighting; a rampage of "Green" destruction (led and moderated by Preston) leaving a trail of burned-out hypermarkets, wrecked fast food outlets, and vast expanses of napalmed intensive farming. Ax Preston’s succeeds in supporting his country through the crisis, utilizing his guile, self-sacrifice, goodwill, and the power of the music. In England, the revolution never descends into a terror.

Inspiration
The titles of all the novels in the Bold as Love Sequence are taken from songs by or works related to Jimi Hendrix. Bold As Love is named for Hendrix's second studio album, Axis: Bold As Love.

References

See also

Bold as Love website
SFsite review
Infinity Plus review
Independent Online review
Bold as Love at Worlds Without End

British fantasy novels
Dystopian novels
Utopian novels
British science fiction novels
British post-apocalyptic novels
British satirical novels
2001 British novels
2001 science fiction novels
2001 fantasy novels
Victor Gollancz Ltd books